The One Ring is a central plot element in J. R. R. Tolkien's The Lord of the Rings.

One ring may also refer to:

 the missed call telephone scam, a phone fraud
 TheOneRing.net, a fandom website for Middle-Earth related topics
 The One Ring Roleplaying Game, a tabletop role-playing game 
 The One Ring (Legends), a module for the play-by-mail game

See also
 
 Ring 1 (disambiguation)
 Ring (disambiguation)
 The Ring (disambiguation)
 Power ring (disambiguation)
 TOR (disambiguation)
 Monocyclic aromatic hydrocarbon, 1-ringed aromatic hydrocarbons
 Heterocyclic compounds, 1-ring